Temirlan Yerlanuly Yerlanov (Temırlan Erlanūly Erlanov; born 9 July 1993) is a Kazakhstani footballer who plays as a defender for FC Aktobe and the Kazakhstan national team.

Career

Club
On 5 January 2020, FC Tobol announced the signing of Yerlanov on a contract until the end of 2020.

International
Yerlanov made his debut for Kazakhstan on 21 February 2019, starting in a friendly against Moldova before being substituted off at half-time, with the match finishing as a 1–0 win.

Career statistics

Club

International

International goals
Scores and results list Kazakhstan's goal tally first.

References

External links
 
 
 
 
 

1993 births
Living people
Kazakhstani footballers
Kazakhstan international footballers
Association football defenders
FC Zhetysu players
FC Sunkar players
FC Vostok players
FC Ordabasy players
FC Tobol players
FC Aktobe players
Kazakhstan Premier League players